Arabesque was an all-girl trio formed at the height of the European disco era in 1977 in Frankfurt, West Germany. The group's changing lineup worked with the German composer Jean Frankfurter (Erich Ließmann) and became especially popular in Japan.

History

1975–1978: Formation and early years 

In 1975, schlager music singer Mary Ann Nagel proposed a girl group to producer Wolfgang Mewes, who accepted. Two additional members were recruited through a singing competition. An Englishwoman (Karen Ann Tepperis), a German-Uzbek (Michaela Rose), and a German (Mary Ann Nagel) comprised the initial group.

After the first album, the band lineup changed by keeping only the original member Michaela Rose, while replacing the two other girls, Karen Ann Tepperis and Mary Ann Nagel, with new members Jasmin Vetter and Heike Rimbeau, respectively. Nagel was replaced due to her becoming tired of the long daily commute from Karlsruhe to Frankfurt am Main, where the group was based. Tepperis was replaced due to the fact that she was pregnant and could not go on tour. The surprising overnight success of Hello Mr. Monkey in Japan prompted the producers to schedule an immediate tour to Japan. The duration of Heike Rimbeau in the group was also short-lived; due to her pregnancy in 1978, she was briefly substituted with Elke Brückheimer. This German country singer appeared only in a few live performances during the year 1979. However, shortly afterward, she too was replaced by Sandra Lauer. Lauer had previously attended the Young Star Music contest in 1975, where she achieved a record deal and released the song "Andy mein Freund" ("My Friend Andy"). In 1979, at age 17, Lauer was invited to become the lead singer of Arabesque.

1979–1984: Breakthrough 

Arabesque became extremely popular in Japan, and also had success in the USSR. The group first appeared in Japan in 1979 for a television special, performing Hello Mr. Monkey on the 11PM TV show. Lauer even spent her 18th birthday in Japan while they were on tour there in May 1980. They later took part in the Seoul Song Festival in 1981. Further, the group performed a number of concerts in Japan between 1980–1982. During these, they released a live album, dubbed "Fancy Concert". All in all, Arabesque came to Japan on tours a total of 6 times during their career.

Back at home in Germany in 1980, the single "Take Me Don't Break Me" became a hit, which only scraped the German Top 40. Their next single, "Marigot Bay", would become their only Top Ten hit a few weeks later. They made multiple TV appearances in Europe with this song about a lost love. Arabesque never had the same level of success in Germany than in the Far East. Albeit they were almost identical in appearance to other European disco trios (i.e. A La Carte or Luv'), their songs were mostly written to cater a Japanese audience instead of the European discotheque scene. A mere 5 albums were released in their entirety in Germany. The group did release in some 20 other countries, such as Italy, Mexico, Scandinavia, and even became Number 1 in Argentina for some time.

The group's two last singles, "Ecstasy" and "Time To Say Goodbye", became hits only after their split, in various European countries, as they sounded very close to the Italo disco sound, a very popular music genre on the European dance scene at that time. Those songs spread and gained success through LP compilations of dance/pop music, and bootleg tapes, so the band could never take advantage of this success, as neither of those songs could properly appear on any music charts as "singles" anyway.

1985–1989: Duo Rouge

After they split up in 1984, Jasmin and Michaela continued on as the duo "Rouge". The duo aimed to continue the tradition and style of Arabesque, and surprisingly featured Jasmin Vetter as the lead singer.

After split

After split, Sandra embarked in a solo career becoming a successful singer worldwide. While Sandra's success spread worldwide, the interest on Arabesque raised as well. The last Arabesque singles also introduced the "Italo disco" sound to Japan, under the term "eurobeat", previously used in the UK for the Stock Aitken Waterman productions.

2006–present: Comebacks 

On 16 December 2006, Arabesque (featuring Michaela Rose and two new members, Sabine Kaemper and Silke Brauner) headlined the second "Legends of Retro FM" festival in Moscow.  According to Russian press at the time, they were planning a tour in Japan and possibly releasing a new album. The current trio has been performing across many of the former Eastern Bloc countries, as of 2018. 
In 2017, Michaela Rose re-recorded one of the Arabesque songs, "Zanzibar", that was released with a support from Monopol Records Also in 2017, Jasmin Vetter launched her own reincarnation of the group (Jasmin Vetter of Arabesque and the City Cats), as part of a celebration of the 40-year anniversary of the group.

Discography

1978 – Friday Night (also called Arabesque I)
1979 – City Cats (also called Arabesque II)
1980 – Marigot Bay (also called Arabesque III)
1980 – Midnight Dancer (also called Arabesque IV)
1981 – In for a Penny (also called Arabesque V or Billy's Barbeque)
1982 – Caballero (also called Arabesque VI)
1982 – Why No Reply (also called Arabesque VII)
1983 – Loser Pays the Piper (also called Arabesque VIII)
1984 – Time to Say Goodbye (also called Arabesque IX)
2018 – The Up Graded Collection

References

External links

Official page in VK
arabesque-music.de
plala.or.jp
Official Facebook page

Musical groups established in 1977
Musical groups disestablished in 1984
1977 establishments in West Germany
1984 disestablishments in West Germany
German musical trios
German disco groups
Eurodisco groups
German dance music groups
German girl groups